Richard Greenberg (born 1958) is an American playwright and television writer.

Richard Greenberg may also refer to:

Richard Greenberg (water polo) (born 1902), American water polo player
Richard Alan Greenberg, American designer of special effects
Richard Greenberg (director), American director and screenwriter of Desert Saints